FC Bayern Munich won the Bundesliga and the German domestic cup, following a season without trophies in the year before. Despite the 16-point margin to the second-placed VfB Stuttgart in the Bundesliga, the season was not regarded as a complete success due to a humiliating run in the UEFA Champions League, where the club earned only two points from six matches. Even though it arguably had the toughest group of all, with Milan, Deportivo de La Coruña and Lens as opponents, early elimination was still not expected with signings such as Michael Ballack, Zé Roberto and Sebastian Deisler, and incumbents such as the 2002 FIFA World Cup's player of the tournament Oliver Kahn in the squad.

Results

Friendlies

Trofeo Santiago Bernabéu

Bundesliga

League results

DFB-Pokal

DFB-Ligapokal

Champions League

Qualifying round results

3rd qualifying round

Group stage results

1st Group Stage

Team statistics

Squad information

Transfers

Statistics

Minutes played

Bookings

Suspensions

Transfers

In
First Team

Out

Notes

FC Bayern Munich seasons
Bayern Munchen
German football championship-winning seasons